The Dunfermline Vikings were an ice hockey club based in Dunfermline, Scotland that played between 1946 and 1955. They played in the Scottish National League between their formation and 1954. In that year they became one of the founding members of the British National League. They finished bottom of the Autumn Cup table with two wins from 22 games, before withdrawing from the league after 11 games of the regular season in 1955.

Honours

Scottish Playoff champions : 1946–47
Scottish Autumn Cup winners : 1946–47
Canada Cup winners : 1946–47
Simpson Trophy winners : 1947–48

References

Ice hockey teams in Scotland
1946 establishments in Scotland
Ice hockey clubs established in 1946
1955 disestablishments in Scotland
Sports clubs disestablished in 1955
Sport in Fife
Dunfermline
Viking Age in popular culture